Mitchell's flat lizard (Platysaurus mitchelli) is a species of lizards in the family Cordylidae.

Etymology
The specific name, mitchelli, is in honor of naturalist Bernard Lindley Mitchell of the Department of Game, Fish, and Tsetse Control in Nyasaland (now Malawi) in the 1940s.

Geographic range
P. mitchelli is found in Malawi.

Reproduction
P. mitchelli is oviparous.

References

Further reading
Loveridge A (1953). "Zoological Results of a Fifth Expedition to East Africa. III. Reptiles from Nyasaland and Tete". Bull. Mus. Comp. Zool. Harvard College 110 (3): 142–322. (Platysaurus mitchelli, new species, pp. 234–237).
Stanley, Edward L.; Bauer, Aaron M.; Jackman, Todd R.; Branch, William R.; Mouton, P. Le Fras N. (2011). "Between a rock and a hard polytomy: Rapid radiation in the rupicolous girdled lizards (Squamata: Cordylidae)". Molecular Phylogenetics and Evolution 58 (1): 53–70.

External links
 Taxonomy and range of Platysaurus mitchelli at ZipcodeZoo.com

Platysaurus
Endemic fauna of Malawi
Reptiles described in 1953
Taxa named by Arthur Loveridge
Reptiles of Malawi